Pedro Antonio Blanco (12 June 1952 – 21 January 2000) was  a lieutenant colonel of the Spanish Army.

He was killed by the explosion of a car bomb, placed by the separatist group ETA. That attempt finished with a 14-month truce.

References

1952 births
2000 deaths
Spanish colonels
20th-century Spanish military personnel